Paulina Sepúlveda (born 15 September 1968) is a Chilean former professional tennis player.

Biography
Sepúlveda made her debut for the Chile Fed Cup team as a 15-year old in 1984. She continued to play in the Fed Cup during her junior career and was a girls' singles quarter-finalist at the 1986 Wimbledon Championships.

At the 1991 Pan American Games in Havana, Sepúlveda won a bronze medal in the women's doubles event, partnering Paula Cabezas. 

Following a five-year absence, she returned to Fed Cup tennis in 1992, in the lead up to the 1992 Barcelona Olympics, which she qualified for as a singles player. She was beaten in the first round of the Olympics by Sandra Cecchini.

In 1996 she made another Fed Cup comeback and finished her career with appearances in a total of 16 ties.

ITF finals

Singles (2–1)

Doubles (2–0)

References

External links
 
 
 

1968 births
Living people
Chilean female tennis players
Tennis players at the 1991 Pan American Games
Pan American Games bronze medalists for Chile
Pan American Games medalists in tennis
South American Games medalists in tennis
South American Games silver medalists for Chile
Competitors at the 1982 Southern Cross Games
Competitors at the 1986 South American Games
Medalists at the 1991 Pan American Games
20th-century Chilean women